Håbbestad is a village in Grimstad municipality in Agder county, Norway. The village is located about half way between the villages of Rykene and Fevik on the north shore of the lake Temse.

References

Villages in Agder
Grimstad